SS Sangola was a merchant ship of 5,149 gross register tons launched in 1901. She was owned by the British India Steam Navigation Company

From 1908 to 1910 Sangola made six voyages to Fiji bringing Indian indentured labourers from Calcutta and Madras as shown in the table below.

In September 1914 she carried troops between India and Marseilles and was sold to Japanese owners in June 1923. Renamed Goshu Maru, she served her Japanese owners until 1933, when she was scrapped in Japan.

See also 
 Indian Indenture Ships to Fiji

References

Ships of the British India Steam Navigation Company
Indian indenture ships to Fiji
Victorian-era passenger ships of the United Kingdom
1901 ships